The 1982 Highland Masters was a professional invitational snooker tournament, which took place between 16 and 18 April 1982 at the Eden Court Theatre in Inverness, Scotland.

Ray Reardon won the tournament beating John Spencer 11–4 in the final.

Main draw

References

Highland Masters
Highland Masters
Highland Masters
Highland Masters